The Hikmat Kumar Karki cabinet is the 4th provincial government of Koshi Province. It was formed after Hikmat Kumar Karki was sworn in as Chief Minister of Koshi Province on 9 January 2023.

Ministries

Current Formation

Until 25 February 2023

Ministries by Party

References 

Provincial cabinets of Nepal
2023 establishments in Nepal
Government of Koshi Province